Poetry has been featured extensively in Thai literature, and constituted the near-exclusive majority of literary works up to the early Rattanakosin period (early 19th century). Most of imaginative literary works in Thai, before the 19th century, were composed in poetry. Consequently, although many literary works were lost with the sack of Ayutthaya in 1767, Thailand still has a great number of epic poems or long poetic tales  -- some with original stories and some with stories drawn from foreign sources. The Siamese poetical medium consists of five main forms, known as khlong, chan, kap, klon and rai; some of these developed indigenously while others were borrowed from other languages. Thai poetry dates to the Sukhothai period (13th–14th centuries) and flourished under Ayutthaya (14th–18th centuries), during which it developed into its current forms. Though many works were lost to the Burmese conquest of Ayutthaya in 1767, sponsorship by subsequent kings helped revive the art, with new works created by many great poets, including Sunthorn Phu (1786–1855). Prose writing as a literary form was introduced as a Western import during the reign of King Mongkut (1851–68) and gradually gained popularity, though poetry saw a revival during the reign of King Vajiravudh (1910–25), who authored and sponsored both traditional poetry and the newer literary forms. Poetry's popularity as a mainstream form of literature gradually declined afterwards, although it is still written and read, and is regularly employed ceremonially.

Forms
Thai poetic works follow established prosodic forms, known as chanthalak. Almost all have rules governing the exact metre and rhyme structure, i.e. the number of syllables in each line and which syllable rhymes with which. Certain forms also specify the tone or tone marks of syllables; others have requirements of syllable "heaviness". Alliteration and within-line rhyming are also often employed, but are not required by the rules.

Khlong
The khlong is the among oldest Thai poetic forms. This is reflected in its requirements on the tone markings of certain syllables, which must be marked with mai ek or mai tho. This was likely derived from when the Thai language had three tones (as opposed to today's five, a split which occurred during the Ayutthaya period), two of which corresponded directly to the aforementioned marks. It is usually regarded as an advanced and sophisticated poetic form.

In khlong, a stanza (bot) has a number of lines (bat, from Pali and Sanskrit pāda), depending on the type. The bat are subdivided into two wak (from Sanskrit varga). The first wak has five syllables, the second has a variable number, also depending on the type, and may be optional. The type of khlong is named by the number of bat in a stanza; it may also be divided into two main types: khlong suphap and khlong dan. The two differ in the number of syllables in the second wak of the final bat and inter-stanza rhyming rules.

Khlong si suphap
The khlong si suphap is the most common form still currently employed. It has four bat per stanza (si translates as four). The first wak of each bat has five syllables. The second wak has two or four syllables in the first and third bat, two syllables in the second, and four syllables in the fourth. Mai ek is required for seven syllables and Mai tho is required for four, as shown below. "Dead word" syllables are allowed in place of syllables which require mai ek, and changing the spelling of words to satisfy the criteria is usually acceptable.

The following plan shows the rhyming structure of one stanza. Each letter represents a syllable; A and B (also C, D, E and F in other examples) represent rhyming syllables. Syllables shown by letters in parentheses are optional.

The following plan shows the tone mark requirements; each ◌ represents one syllable.

Example

Transcriptions:

Translation:

Chan
The chan (from Pali chando), is derived from Pali and Sanskrit metres, and based on the Vuttodaya, a Sri Lankan treatise on Pali prosody. It developed during the Ayutthaya period, and became a prominent poetic form, but declined afterwards until it resurfaced in a 1913 revival.

The main feature of the chan is its requirements on the "heaviness" of each syllable. Syllables are classified as either "light" (lahu), those with a short vowel and open ending, or "heavy" (kharu, ; See also Light and heavy syllables under Sanskrit prosody). The Thai metres follow their Pali/Sanskrit origins, with added rhyming schemes. Modern authors have also invented new forms for their compositions. Two traditional forms are shown here.

Inthrawichian chan
The inthrawichian chan (from Indravajra, a form of Sanskrit poetry and meaning Indra's thunderbolt) has two bat per stanza, with eleven syllables in each bat, following the pattern HHLHH LLHLHH (H represents heavy and L represents light syllables):

The rhyming scheme (which is identical to that of kap yani, see below) is shown here in two stanzas:

Example

Transcription:

Translation:

Wasantadilok chan

The following plan shows the rhyme structure in two stanzas.

Example

Transcription:

Translation:

Kap
There are several forms of kap, each with its specific metre and rhyming rules. The kap may have originated either from the Indic metres or from Cambodian forms.

Kap yani
The kap yani (or yani sip et, sip et meaning eleven, referring to the number of syllables per bat) has two bat per stanza. Each has two wak, with five and six syllables. It is slow in rhythm, and usually used to describe beauty and nature. The following plan shows the rhyming scheme in two stanzas; the spaces show the usual rhythmic breaks (not shown in writing).

Example

Transcription:

Kap chabang
The kap chabang (or chabang sip hok, sip hok meaning sixteen, the number of syllables per stanza) has three wak per stanza, with six syllables in the first and third, and four syllables in the second. It is often used for narratives, and often accompanies the chan. The following plan shows two stanzas.

Example

Transcription:

Translation:

Kap surangkhanang
The kap surangkhanang yi sip paet (yi sip paet means twenty-eight) has seven wak per stanza, with four syllables in each wak. A less common form is surangkhanang sam sip song (thirty-two), with eight wak per stanza. Its rhythm is fast, and is used to describe anger and fighting. The following plan shows two stanzas of surangkhanang 28.

Klon

In the generic sense, klon originally referred to any type of poetry. In the narrow sense it refers to a more recently developed form where a stanza has four wak, each with the same number of syllables. It is usually considered an original Thai form. The klon metres are named by the number of syllables in a wak, e.g. klon hok has six syllables per wak (hok means six). All metres have the same rhyming scheme, and there are also requirements on the tone of the final syllable of each wak. The klon is also divided into several types according to their manner of composition, with klon suphap being the basic form.

The following plan shows the structure of klon suphap (two stanzas) in the most common eight-syllable variety, which was employed extensively by Sunthorn Phu, and is the most common form of the Rattanakosin period. The letters in parentheses represent alternative rhyming syllables. In practice, occasional wak with seven or nine syllables are also acceptable.

Example

Transcription:

Rai
The rai is probably the oldest Thai poetic form and was used in laws and chronicles. It is also the simplest. It consists of a continuing series of wak of unspecified number, usually with five syllables each, and with rhymes from the last syllable of a wak to the first, second or third of the next. Some variations don't specify the number of syllables per wak and are actually a form of rhymed prose. A composition consisting of rai alternating with (and ending with) khlong is known as lilit, and suggests that the khlong developed from the rai. The following is the form of rai known as rai boran.

OOOA   A(A)(A)OB   B(B)(B)OC   C(C)(C)OD   D(D)(D)OE   E(E)(E)OO ...

Example

Reading
When read aloud, Thai poetry may be read conventionally, or in a melodic fashion known as thamnong sano (lit. pleasing melody). Thamnong sano has many melodic styles, and there are also other specific styles used for certain performances, such as sepha. Thamnong sano reading is often featured in student competitions, along with other forms of language-related performances.

Notes

References

 
Poetry
Poetry by country
Poetic forms